Pocillopora is a genus of stony corals in the family Pocilloporidae occurring in the Pacific and Indian Oceans. They are commonly called cauliflower corals and brush corals.

Description
Cauliflower corals are widespread and can be identified by the presence of wart-like growths on their surface. The colonies can be dome shaped or branching and are very variable in colour and shape depending on the species and the environmental conditions. Species situated on shallow reefs pounded by the sea tend to be stunted whilst those in deep calm water are often thin and open. Each individual polyp has tentacles but these are normally extended only at night.

Biology
The polyps are hermaphrodite, possessing four sets of male and four sets of female gonads. Pocillopora can reproduce asexually via fragmentation. They also reproduce sexually and the larvae develop inside the polyps rather than free floating in the water. When they are mature, the larvae are released and can remain free-swimming for several weeks before settling on the substrate.

Pocillopora corals contain microscopic symbiotic algae (zooxanthellae) living within them. Through photosynthesis, these algae produce energy-rich molecules that the coral polyps can assimilate. In return, the coral provides the algae with protection and access to sunlight. The polyps also feed by capturing tiny particles using their tentacles. These corals are widespread because they sometimes attach to floating objects and can be carried far afield by currents and wind.

Species
The World Register of Marine Species includes the following species in the genus:

 Pocillopora acuta Lamarck, 1816
 Pocillopora aliciae Schmidt-Roach, Miller & Andreakis, 2013
 Pocillopora ankeli Scheer & Pillai, 1974
 Pocillopora bairdi Schmidt-Roach, 2014
 Pocillopora brevicornis Lamarck, 1816
 Pocillopora capitata Verrill, 1864
 Pocillopora damicornis (Linnaeus, 1758)
 Pocillopora effusus Veron, 2002
 Pocillopora elegans Dana, 1846
 Pocillopora fungiformis Veron, 2002
 Pocillopora grandis Milne Edwards & Haime, 1860
 Pocillopora indiania Veron, 2002
 Pocillopora inflata Glynn, 1999
 Pocillopora kelleheri Veron, 2002
 Pocillopora ligulata Dana, 1846
 Pocillopora mauritiana Brüggemann, 1877
 Pocillopora meandrina Dana, 1846
 Pocillopora molokensis Vaughan, 1907
 Pocillopora verrucosa (Ellis and Solander, 1786)
 †Pocillopora vitiensis Hoffmeister, 1945
 Pocillopora woodjonesi Vaughan, 1918
 Pocillopora zelli Veron, 2002

Non exhaustive gallery of symbionts

References

Pocilloporidae
Scleractinia genera
Cnidarians of the Indian Ocean
Cnidarians of the Pacific Ocean
Taxa named by Jean-Baptiste Lamarck